A ringgit is the common term for the currency used in Malaysia.

Ringgit may also refer to:

Brunei dollar (called  in Malay), currency used in Brunei
Singapore dollar, currency used in Singapore